KBCL (branded as Praise 1070) is a United States radio station serving the Shreveport-Bossier City metropolitan area with a Christian talk radio format.  The station broadcasts on AM frequency 1070 kHz and is currently under ownership of Barnabas Center Ministries.

References

External links
Praise 1070 - Official Website

Radio stations established in 1957
1957 establishments in Louisiana
Daytime-only radio stations in Louisiana
Christian radio stations in Louisiana
Bossier City, Louisiana
Talk radio stations in the United States